Aethes pinara is a species of moth of the family Tortricidae. It is found on Cuba.

The wingspan is about 8 mm for males and 9 mm for females. The ground colour of the forewings is whitish, the base of the costa suffused with brownish. The markings are brown-yellow with a few brown dots. The hindwings are whitish, tinged with yellowish terminally.

Etymology
The species name refers to Pinar Rio, the name of the type locality.

References

Moths described in 2007
pinara
Moths of the Caribbean
Endemic fauna of Cuba